Events from the year 1611 in France.

Incumbents

Monarch: Louis XIII
Regent: Marie de' Medici

Events

Births
 
 September 11 – Henri de la Tour d'Auvergne, Vicomte de Turenne, Marshal of France (d. 1675)
 probable – Charles de Batz-Castelmore d'Artagnan, French count and musketeer, on which the fictional D'Artagnan from the novel The Three Musketeers is based (d. 1673)

Deaths

 June 8 – Jean Bertaut, French poet (b. 1552)
 October 3 – Charles of Lorraine, Duke of Mayenne, French military leader (b. 1554)

See also

References

1610s in France